Little Cawthorpe is a village and civil parish in the East Lindsey district of Lincolnshire, England.

Little Cawthorpe red-brick church, dedicated to St Helen, was built in 1860 by R. J. Withers to replace an earlier church.  It was declared redundant in 1996 by the Diocese of Lincoln,  and is a Grade II listed building.

The Manor House is a small red-brick country house dating from 1673 with some 20th-century alterations and additions, and is Grade II* listed.  The gate piers to the Manor House are Grade II listed and also date from 1673, although the wrought iron gates are 20th-century.

Kenwick Park Golf Club lies to the north of the village.

References

External links

Villages in Lincolnshire
Civil parishes in Lincolnshire
East Lindsey District